James Malone House is a historic home located near Leasburg, Caswell County, North Carolina.  It was built in 1861, and is a two-story, three bays wide, Italianate style frame house on a brick foundation. It has a hipped roof and features a two-story pedimented entrance porch and brick end chimneys.  The interior and exterior features woodwork attributed to noted African-American cabinetmaker Thomas Day.

It was added to the National Register of Historic Places in 2008.

References

Houses on the National Register of Historic Places in North Carolina
Italianate architecture in North Carolina
Houses completed in 1861
Houses in Caswell County, North Carolina
National Register of Historic Places in Caswell County, North Carolina
1861 establishments in North Carolina